Arif Doğru (born 4 June 1951) is a Turkish boxer. He competed in the men's light flyweight event at the 1972 Summer Olympics.

References

1951 births
Living people
Turkish male boxers
Olympic boxers of Turkey
Boxers at the 1972 Summer Olympics
People from Boğazlıyan
Mediterranean Games bronze medalists for Turkey
Mediterranean Games medalists in boxing
Competitors at the 1971 Mediterranean Games
Light-flyweight boxers
20th-century Turkish people